Crypsiptya megaptyona is a moth in the family Crambidae. It was described by George Hampson in 1918. It is found in Malawi, Mozambique and Tanzania.

References

Moths described in 1918
Pyraustinae